Clubul Sportiv Minerul Motru, commonly known as Minerul Motru is a Romanian amateur football club based in Motru, Gorj County, currently playing in the Liga IV, the fourth tier of the Romanian football league system. The club was founded in 1962 and at its best played at the level of Liga II.

History
Minerul Motru was founded in 1962 as Minerul Horăști and played in the district and regional championship. In 1966, with the attestation of the city of Motru, the club changed its name to Minerul Motru.

"The Miners" reached Divizia C in 1968 and after five seasons in the third division, at the end of the 1972–73 season, promoted for the first time in Divizia B and throughout its history gathered no less than seventeen seasons at the level of the second tier, where it was ranked as it follows: 15th of 18 (1973–74), 15th of 18 (1975–76), 4th of 18 (1982–83), 11th of 18 (1983–84), 18th of 18 (1984–85), 13th of 18 (1988–89), 9th of 18 (1989–90), 17th of 18 (1990–91), 11th of 18 (1995–96), 4th of 18 (1996–97), 7th of 18 (1997–98), 9th of 18 (1998–99), 18th of 18 (1999–2000), 10th of 16 (2003–04), 10th of 16 (2004–05), 11th of 16 (2005–06) and 10th of 12 (2013–14). Its best finish was at the end of the 1982–83 and 1996–97 seasons, when it finished 4th.

In the Cupa României, the club's best achievement was when it reached the Round of 32 phase in the 2002–03 season.

In the summer of 2016, after serious financial problems, the senior team was disbanded, but the club continue to exist at youth level.

In the summer of 2021, it was announced that the senior team of Minerul started again its activity, after 5 years.

Honours
Liga III
Winners (7): 1972–73, 1974–75, 1981–82, 1987–88, 1994–95, 2001–02, 2012–13
Runners-up (5): 1986–87, 1993–94, 2000–01, 2006–07, 2011–12

Other performances
 Appearances in Liga II: 17
 Best finish in Liga II: 4th  (1982–83, 1996–97)
 Best finish in Cupa României: Round of 32 (2002–03)

Notable former players
The footballers enlisted below have had international cap(s) for their respective countries at junior and/or senior level and/or more than 50 caps for CS Minerul Motru.

  Aurel Amzucu
  Augustin Chiriță
  Cătălin Crăciunescu
  Cornel Frăsineanu
  Nenad Kutlačić
  Florea Martinovici
  Daniel Stana

Notable former managers

  Gheorghe Borugă
  Silviu Lung
  Ștefan Nanu
  Constantin Oțet
  Victor Roșca

References

Football clubs in Gorj County
Association football clubs established in 1962
Liga II clubs
Liga III clubs
Liga IV clubs
Mining association football teams in Romania
1962 establishments in Romania